Reda Belahyane (born 1 June 2004) is a French professional footballer who plays as a defensive midfielder for Ligue 1 club Nice.

Club career
Belahyane is a youth product of Olympique Pantin, Aubervilliers, Red Star and Montfermeil FC before joining Nice's youth side in 2019. On 20 October 2021, he signed his first professional contract with Nice. He made his professional debut with Nice as a late substitute in a 1–1 Ligue 1 tie with Auxerre on 3 March 2023.

International career
Born in France, Belahyane is of Moroccan descent. He was part of the France U18s that won the 2022 Mediterranean Games football tournament.

Honours
France U18
Mediterranean Games: 2022

References

External links
 
 
 FFF Profile
 OGC Nice profile

2004 births
Living people
Sportspeople from Aubervilliers
French footballers
France youth international footballers
French sportspeople of Moroccan descent
Association football midfielders
OGC Nice players
Ligue 1 players
Championnat National 3 players